Fläsklägg med rotmos is a dish in Swedish cuisine, closely related to German Eisbein. The name literally means "ham hock with root mash."

Method
Cured ham hock is cooked for one to two hours together with onions, carrots, and allspice. Rutabaga, potatoes and carrots are then diced and cooked soft in the broth, then drained and mashed. It may be served with different kinds of mustard; the preferred one is a traditional sweet mustard. The use of allspice is common in Swedish cuisine.

See also
 List of ham dishes – also includes ham hock dishes

References

External links

Swedish cuisine
Ham dishes